Interior Township is a civil township of Ontonagon County in the U.S. state of Michigan.  The population was 270 at the 2020 census. It was named for the Interior Lumber Company.

Communities
Agate is an unincorporated community on M-28, about eight miles east of Bruce Crossing. Agate Falls Scenic Site.  on the middle branch of the Ontonagon River is nearby. It was originally known as Agate Siding, after the spur from the Duluth, South Shore and Atlantic Railway (now the Soo Line Railroad) created in about 1890 to serve nearby mining operations. It was named for the agate stone. 
Calderwood was established in the 1880s around a lumbermill.  It had a post office beginning in 1908.
The ZIP Code is 49967. The nearby Trout Creek is a tributary of the Ontonagon River. This was a station on the Duluth, South Shore and Atlantic Railway (now the Soo Line Railroad).

Geography
A large portion of the township is within the Ottawa National Forest.

Demographics
As of the census of 2000, there were 375 people, 173 households, and 112 families residing in the township.  The population density was 4.3 per square mile (1.7/km2).  There were 303 housing units at an average density of 3.5 per square mile (1.4/km2).  The racial makeup of the township was 96.27% White, 3.20% Native American, 0.27% from other races, and 0.27% from two or more races.

There were 173 households, out of which 16.8% had children under the age of 18 living with them, 50.9% were married couples living together, 7.5% had a female householder with no husband present, and 34.7% were non-families. 31.2% of all households were made up of individuals, and 21.4% had someone living alone who was 65 years of age or older.  The average household size was 2.17 and the average family size was 2.68.

In the township the population was spread out, with 15.5% under the age of 18, 8.0% from 18 to 24, 17.1% from 25 to 44, 34.1% from 45 to 64, and 25.3% who were 65 years of age or older.  The median age was 50 years. For every 100 females, there were 98.4 males.  For every 100 females age 18 and over, there were 93.3 males.

The median income for a household in the township was $27,679, and the median income for a family was $35,208. Males had a median income of $28,125 versus $19,375 for females. The per capita income for the township was $16,906.  About 5.2% of families and 11.4% of the population were below the poverty line, including none of those under age 18 and 22.9% of those age 65 or over.

Notable people
 Dick Pole, Major League Baseball pitcher and coach, was born in Trout Creek.

References

Sources

Townships in Ontonagon County, Michigan
Townships in Michigan